Iván Faragó (1 April 1946 – 12 December 2022) was a Hungarian chess grandmaster. He was awarded the grandmaster title in 1976, won the Hungarian championship in 1986 and was an active player for over fifty years. He played in the German Bundesliga, where he represented the Griesheim chess club. He was born in Budapest.

External links

References 

1946 births
2022 deaths
Hungarian chess players
Chess grandmasters
Sportspeople from Budapest